Peribronchial cuffing, also referred to as peribronchial thickening or bronchial wall thickening, is a radiologic sign which occurs when excess fluid or mucus buildup in the small airway passages of the lung causes localized patches of atelectasis (lung collapse). This causes the area around the bronchus to appear more prominent on an X-ray. It has also been described as donut sign, considering the edge is thicker, and the center contains air.


Examples
Peribronchial cuffing is seen in a number of conditions including:
 Acute bronchitis
 Asthma following exercise or during an acute episode
 Bronchiolitis
 Bronchopulmonary dysplasia
 Congestive heart failure
 Cystic fibrosis
 Diffuse parenchymal lung disease
 Extreme exertion through physical exercise
 Hantavirus pulmonary syndrome
 Human metapneumovirus
 Kawasaki disease
 Lung cancer
 Pneumonia
 Pulmonary edema
 Smoke inhalation

Treatment
As peribronchial cuffing is a sign rather than a symptom or condition, there is no specific treatment except to treat the underlying cause.

References

Bronchus disorders
Radiologic signs